The following is a list of Sites of Special Scientific Interest in the Gordon and Aberdeen Area of Search. For other areas, see List of SSSIs by Area of Search.

 Balmedie Quarry
 Bellscamphie
 Bin Quarry
 Collieston to Whinnyfold Coast
 Corby, Lily And Bishops Lochs
 Correen Hills
 Cove
 Craigs of Succoth
 Den of Pitlurg
 Foveran Links
 Gight Woods
 Green Hill of Strathdon
 Hill of Barra
 Hill of Johnston
 Hill of Towanreef
 Inchrory
 Ladder Hills
 Loch of Skene
 Meikle Loch and Kippet Hills
 Mortlach Moss
 Morven and Mullachdubh
 Moss of Kirkhill
 Nigg Bay
 Old Wood of Drum
 Paradise Wood
 Pitcaple and Legatsden Quarries
 Pittodrie
 Portlethen Moss
 Red Moss, Netherley
 Red Moss, Oldtown
 Rhynie Chert
 Sands of Forvie and Ythan Estuary
 Scotstown Moor
 Tilliefoure Wood
 Tips of Corsemaul and Tom Mor
 Wartle Moss
 Whitehill

 
Gordon and Aberdeen
Sites of Special Scientific Interest